Gloucester Premier is an English rugby union league which sits at the eighth level of league rugby union in England with teams largely being based in the county of Gloucestershire and Bristol. Originally a single division called Gloucestershire/Somerset, in 2000 the division split into two county leagues called Gloucester Premier and Somerset Premier.

The league champions are automatically promoted to Western Counties North while the runner-up play the runner-up from Somerset Premier for the third promotion place. Relegated teams drop down into Gloucester 1.  Each year all clubs in the division also take part in the RFU Senior Vase - a level 8 national competition.

Teams 2021–22

St Mary's Old Boys and Berry Hill who finished 9th and 10th respectively in 2019-20 but will play in Gloucester 1 in the current season.  Their places were taken by Clifton II and Dings Crusaders II.

2020–21
Due to the COVID-19 pandemic, the 2020–21 season was cancelled.

Teams 2019–20

Teams 2018–19

Teams 2017–18

Teams 2016–17

Teams 2015–16
The 2015–16 Gloucester Premier consisted of twelve teams from Gloucestershire and Bristol. The season started on 5 September 2015 and the last match was played on 23 April 2016.  Eight of the twelve teams participated in last season's competition.

League table

Teams 2014–15
Stroud are champions and along with the runner-up Whitehall (play-off winner) were promoted to Western Counties North. Painswick and Gordon League were relegated to Gloucester 1.

Berry Hill (relegated from Western Counties North)
Bream (promoted from Gloucester 1)
Cheltenham Saracens (promoted from Gloucester 1)
Cirencester (relegated from Western Counties North)
Frampton Cotterell
Gordon League
Hucclecote
Painswick
St. Mary's Old Boys
Stroud
Tewkesbury
Whitehall

Teams 2013–14
Bristol Saracens
Dursley
Frampton Cotterill
Gordon League
Hucclecote (promoted from Gloucester 1)
Newent (promoted from Gloucester 1)
Painswick
Southmead
Stroud
St Mary's Old Boys
Tewkesbury
Whitehall

Teams 2012–13
Bristol Saracens
Drybrook
Dursley
Frampton Cotterell
Gordon League
Painswick
Southmead
Stroud	
St Mary's Old Boys (SW)
Tewkesbury
Whitehall
Widden Old Boys

Teams 2011–12
Bishopston
Bristol Saracens
Drybrook
Frampton Cotterell
Longlevens 
Old Bristolians
Old Colstonians
Old Richians
Southmead
St. Mary's Old Boys
Tewkesbury
Widden Old Boys

Teams 2010–11
Bristol Saracens
Brockworth
Frampton Cotterell
Gloucester Old Boys
Old Bristolians
Old Colstonians
Old Richians
Ross-on-Wye RFC
Southmead
Tewkesbury
Whitehall RFC
Widden Old Boys

Teams 2009–10
Bristol Saracens
Cirencester
Frampton Cotterell
Gloucester Old Boys
Hucclecote
Matson
Old Colstonians
Old Richians
Ross-on-Wye RFC
Spartans 
Tewkesbury
Whitehall

Teams 2008–09
Bristol Saraces
Cirencester
Drybrook
Frampton Cotterell
Gloucester Old Boys
Hucclecote
Matson
Old Bristolians
Old Colstonians
Old Richians
Spartans 
Whitehall

Teams 2007–08
Aretians
Cirencester
Drybrook
Frampton Cotterell
Gloucester Old Boys
Hartpury College
Hucclecote
Matson
North Bristol
Old Colstonians
Old Richians
Whitehall

Teams 2006–07
Aretians
Avonmouth Old Boys
Cirencester
Drybrook
Frampton Cotterell
Longlevens
Matson
Old Colstonians
Old Richians
Painswick
Widden Old Boys
Whitehall

Teams 2005–06
Aretians
Barton Hill
Chosen Hill Former Pupils
Drybrook
Longlevens
Matson
Old Colstonians
Old Richians
Painswick
Widden Old Boys

Teams 2004–05
Aretians
Avonmouth Old Boys
Barton Hill
Chosen Hill Former Pupils
Longlevens
North Bristol
Old Richians
Painswick
Southmead
Tewkesbury

Teams 2003–04
Aretians
Avonmouth Old Boys
Cheltenham North
Chipping Sodbury
Cirencester
Chosen Hill Former Pupils
Longlevens
North Bristol
Old Bristolians
Painswick

Teams 2002–03
Aretians
Avonmouth Old Boys
Barton Hill
Cirencester
Chosen Hill Former Pupils
Drybrook
Hucclecote
Longlevens
North Bristol
Painswick

Teams 2001–02
Avonmouth Old Boys
Barton Hill
Bristol Saracens
Cirencester
Chipping Sodbury
Chosen Hill Former Pupils
Drybrook
Hucclecote
Longlevens
Spartans

Original teams
When league rugby began in 1987 this division (known as Gloucestershire/Somerset) contained the following teams from Bristol, Gloucestershire and Somerset:

Avonmouth Old Boys 
Cleve 
Combe Down 
Coney Hill
Gordano
Keynsham
Midsomer Norton 
Minehead Barbarians 
St. Brendan's Old Boys 
Tredworth 
Whitehall

Gloucester Premier honours

Gloucestershire/Somerset (1987–1993)

Originally Gloucester Premier and Somerset Premier were combined in a single division known as Gloucestershire/Somerset, involving teams based in Gloucestershire, Somerset and Bristol.  It was tier 8 league with promotion to Western Counties and relegation to either Gloucestershire 1 or Somerset 1.

Gloucestershire/Somerset (1993–1996)

The creation of National League 5 South for the 1993–94 season meant that Gloucestershire/Somerset dropped to become a tier 9 league.  Promotion continued to Western Counties and relegation to either Gloucester 1 or Somerset 1.

Gloucestershire/Somerset (1996–2000)

The cancellation of National League 5 South at the end of the 1995–96 season meant that Gloucestershire/Somerset reverted to being a tier 8 league.  Further restructuring meant that promotion was now to Western Counties North, while relegation continued to either Gloucester 1 or Somerset 1.

Gloucester Premier (2000–2009)

Gloucestershire/Somerset was reorganised into two county leagues at the end of the 1999–00 season,  Gloucester Premier and Somerset Premier, with both leagues remaining at level 8.  Promotion from Gloucester Premier was to Western Counties North and relegation to Gloucester 1.  Between 2007–2009 Gloucester Premier was sponsored by High Bridge Jewellers.

Gloucester Premier (2009–present)

Despite widespread restructuring by the RFU at the end of the 2008–09 season, Gloucester Premier remained a tier 8 league, with promotion continuing to Western Counties North and relegation to Gloucester 1.  From the 2017–18 season onward Gloucester Premier has been sponsored by Wadworth 6x.

Promotion play-offs
Since the 2000–01 season there has been a play-off between the runners-up of the Gloucester Premier and Somerset Premier for the third and final promotion place to Western Counties North. The team with the superior league record has home advantage in the tie.  At the end of the 2019–20 season Gloucester Premier teams have been the most successful with thirteen wins to the Somerset Premier teams six; and the home team has won promotion on twelve occasions compared to the away teams seven.

Number of league titles

Drybrook (3)
Spartans (3)
Avonmouth Old Boys (2)
Chosen Hill Former Pupils (2)
Barton Hill (1)
Bristol Saracens (1)
Cheltenham North (1)
Chipping Sodbury (1)
Combe Down (1)
Coney Hill (1)
Dings Crusaders (1)
Gloucester Old Boys (1)
Hartpury College (1)
Keynsham (1)
Matson (1)
Newent (1)
North Bristol (1)
Old Bristolians (1)
Old Centralians (1)
Old Culverhaysians (1)
Old Patesians (1)
Old Richians (1)
St. Bernadette's Old Boys (1)
St. Mary's Old Boys (1)
Stroud (1)
Thornbury (1)
Whitehall (1)

Notes

See also
 South West Division RFU
 Gloucestershire RFU
 English rugby union system
 Rugby union in England

References

8
Rugby union in Bristol
Sport in Gloucester
Rugby union in Gloucestershire